This article is a list of pharmacy schools by country.

A

Albania

Algeria

Argentina

Australia

Austria

B

Bangladesh

Belgium

Bosnia and Herzegovina

Brazil

Bulgaria

C

Cambodia

Canada

China

Beijing

Hong Kong

Jiangsu

Macau

Shanghai

Chile

Colombia

Costa Rica

Czech Republic

D

Democratic Republic of Congo

Denmark

Dominican Republic

E

Egypt

Estonia

Ethiopia

F

Fiji

Finland

France

G

Georgia

Germany

Ghana

Greece

Guyana

H

Hungary

I

Iceland

India

Andhra Pradesh

Chhattisgarh

Dadra and Nagar Haveli

Delhi

Gujarat

Haryana

Jammu and Kashmir

Karnataka

Kerala

Madhya Pradesh

Maharashtra

Odisha

Punjab

Rajasthan

Sikkim

Tamil Nadu

Telangana

Uttar Pradesh

Uttarakhand

West Bengal

Indonesia

Iran

Iraq

Ireland

Israel

Italy

J

Jamaica

Japan

Jordan

K

Kenya

Kuwait

L

Latvia

Lebanon

Libya

Lithuania

M

Malaysia

Malta

Mexico

Moldova

Montenegro

Morocco

Myanmar

N

Namibia

Nepal

Netherlands

New Zealand

North Korea

North Macedonia

Norway

P

Pakistan

Palestine

Peru

Philippines

Poland

Portugal

Q

Qatar

R

Romania

Russia

Rwanda

S

Saudi Arabia

Serbia

Singapore

Slovakia

Slovenia

South Africa

South Korea

Spain

Sri Lanka

Sudan

Sweden

Switzerland

Syria

T

Tajikistan

Taiwan (Republic of China)

Tanzania

Thailand

Trinidad and Tobago

Tunisia

Turkey

U

Ukraine

Uganda

United Arab Emirates

United Kingdom

United States

Alabama

Arizona

Arkansas

California

Colorado

Connecticut

District of Columbia

Florida

Georgia

Hawaii

Idaho

Illinois

Indiana

Iowa

Kansas

Kentucky

Louisiana

Maine

Maryland

Massachusetts

Michigan

Minnesota

Mississippi

Missouri

Montana

Nebraska

Nevada

New Jersey

New Mexico

New York

North Carolina

North Dakota

Ohio

Oklahoma

Oregon

Pennsylvania

Puerto Rico

Rhode Island

South Carolina

South Dakota

Tennessee

Texas

Utah

Vermont

Virginia

Washington

West Virginia

Wisconsin

Wyoming

Uruguay

Uzbekistan

V

Venezuela

Vietnam

Z

Zambia

Zimbabwe

See also
 History of pharmacy
 List of medical schools

References

External links

 The Official World List of Pharmacy Schools (WLPS) – FIP Academic Institutional Membership (AIM), International Pharmaceutical Federation (FIP)
 Accredited Professional Programs of Colleges and Schools of Pharmacy – Accreditation Council for Pharmacy Education (ACPE), United States
 Pharmacy Schools on the WWW – virtual library pharmacy